Ardabur (Greek: Άρδαβούρ, died 471) was the son of Flavius Ardabur Aspar, Master of Horse and Magister Militum of the Eastern Roman Empire in the fifth century.  Ardabur apparently often served under his famous father during his campaigns.  In 466 Ardabur was accused of a treasonous plot, probably by his father's political enemies.  The accusation accelerated Aspar's fall from power.  Both Ardabur and Aspar were killed in a riot in 471.

References

5th-century Byzantine people
5th-century Roman consuls
Byzantine generals
Byzantine murder victims
471 deaths
Alanic people
Imperial Roman consuls
Year of birth unknown